Kaqalaq (also Romanized as Kaqālaq; also known as Kafalagh and Kafāleq) is a village in Bozkosh Rural District, in the Central District of Ahar County, East Azerbaijan Province, Iran. At the 2006 census, its population was 785, in 204 families.

References 

Populated places in Ahar County